Ronald Osmond Talbot (26 November 1903 – 5 January 1983), was a cricketer who played first-class cricket in New Zealand from 1922-23 to 1935-36, and toured England with the national team in 1931.

Talbot was educated at Christ's College, Christchurch, where he captained the First XI cricket team and the First XV Rugby team.

A middle-order batsman and medium-pace bowler, he made his first-class debut for Canterbury in a Plunket Shield match against Otago in January 1923, aged 19. He scored 105 in the first innings, the highest score in the match, and after not bowling in Otago's first innings, took 3 for 38 in the second. Canterbury won by 10 wickets, won Talbot's next match as well, and finished the season champions.

In 1925-26 he took 5 for 106 in 18 overs as Wellington made 494 for 9 on the first day, then made a pair when Wellington dismissed Canterbury cheaply twice on the second day. He did not make a fifty between his debut match and 1929–30, when he scored 50 and 113 in a narrow loss to Wellington. In 1930-31 he scored 182 runs at 30.33 and took six wickets at 32.33 to contribute to Canterbury's victory in the Plunket Shield and earn himself selection in the 14-man team to tour England in 1931.

In 24 first-class matches on the tour Talbot made 759 runs at 23.71 with four fifties and a highest score of 66, and took 17 wickets at 50.70. He was the only player not to appear in the Tests. Early in the tour he played a part in the victory over MCC at Lord's, when he made 66 in 50 minutes, "hitting half-volleys as if he hated them", and hitting one ball onto the top of the pavilion roof.

Opening the batting for Canterbury against Auckland in the first match of the 1932-33 season he made 55 and 117, his highest score. He moved to Otago in 1933, playing four matches in the next three seasons with moderate success.

He also played squash, golf, bowls and athletics, and he played rugby for Canterbury.

See also
 List of Otago representative cricketers

References

External links

1903 births
1983 deaths
Canterbury cricketers
New Zealand cricketers
Otago cricketers
People educated at Christ's College, Christchurch
Cricketers from Christchurch